Gina Gionfriddo is an American playwright and television writer. Her play Becky Shaw was a 2009 finalist for the Pulitzer Prize for Drama, and her play Rapture, Blister, Burn was a 2013 finalist for the Pulitzer Prize for Drama. She has written for the television series
Law & Order and "FBI: Most Wanted."

Biography
Gionfriddo grew up in Washington, D.C., where she attended Georgetown Day School. She graduated from Barnard College of Columbia University and completed Brown University's MFA (MFA 1997) playwriting program where she studied with playwright Paula Vogel.

In addition to writing her own material, she has also taught playwriting at Brown University, Providence College, and Rhode Island College.

She has lived in Providence, Rhode Island and currently resides in New York City, where she is a single mother.

Work
She has written for both the stage and for television. She tends to write dark comedies of topics that occasionally touch on the abuse of women and often features male protagonists. U.S. Drag features a series of assaults, After Ashley features rape and murder, Becky Shaw has a robbery at gunpoint.

Television
She was a writer for the television series Law & Order. René Balcer, the head writer and executive producer of Law & Order,  hired her after he read her play After Ashley. Balcer said:  “She really has an ear for the dialogue of everyday Americans and the quirkiness of everyday Americans... the kind of people you see being interviewed on Nancy Grace.” She currently works for The Alienist (TV series).

Stage
For her writing she has received the Susan Smith Blackburn Prize in 2002 for U.S.Drag (in a tie with Susan Miller), the 2002 Helen Merrill Award for Emerging Playwrights, and a 2005 Guggenheim Fellowship. Director Peter DuBois and Gionfriddo met at Brown University in the 1990s, and DuBois directed her thesis production (U.S. Drag) there. He has directed her plays Rapture, Blister, Burn and Becky Shaw.

U. S. Drag was presented by the Connecticut Repertory Theatre Playwrights' Lab (Storrs, Connecticut) in July 1998 in a workshop, directed by Anna Shapiro. The play was next produced by Clubbed Thumb at the HERE Arts Center, New York City in June 2001. The play was directed by Pam MacKinnon. It was produced from February 23, 2008, to March 16, 2008, Off-Broadway by the stageFARM at the Beckett Theatre, directed by Trip Cullman.

Her play After Ashley received the 2005 Obie Award, Performance for Kieran Culkin.

Becky Shaw, which premiered Off-Broadway in 2008, was a finalist for the 2009 Pulitzer Prize for Drama.

Gionfriddo's play, Rapture, Blister, Burn premiered Off-Broadway at Playwrights Horizons in June 2012. The original Off-Broadway cast, which featured Amy Brenneman and Lee Tergesen, performed the play at the Geffen Playhouse, Los Angeles, California in August 2013. The play was a finalist for the 2013 Pulitzer Prize for Drama.

Can You Forgive Her? premiered in Boston at the Huntington Theatre in March 2016. It was directed by Peter Dubois.

Plays
 Can You Forgive Her? (2016)
 Rapture, Blister, Burn (2012)
 Becky Shaw (2008)
 Squalor (2007) (short)
 After Ashley (2004)
 U.S. Drag (2001) (Originally produced by Clubbed Thumb)
 Guinevere (2001)
 Safe (2000) (short)

Television
House of Cards (2013)
Law & Order (Episodes: Betrayal, Driven, Executioner, Bogeyman, Lost Boys)
 Law & Order: Criminal Intent (Episodes: Country Crossover, Masquerade, Vacancy, Dollhouse, Prisoner, Beast, Bombshell)
 Cold Case (Episode: Schadenfreude)
 Law & Order True Crime (Episodes: 3 and 6, Season 1)
The Alienist (TV series) (Episodes: 3 and 4, Season 1)

References

American dramatists and playwrights
American women dramatists and playwrights
Brown University alumni
Living people
Barnard College alumni
American women television writers
Obie Award recipients
Brown University faculty
Place of birth missing (living people)
Year of birth missing (living people)
Providence College faculty
Rhode Island College faculty
Writers from Rhode Island
American television writers
Screenwriters from Rhode Island
Screenwriters from Washington, D.C.
Georgetown Day School alumni
American women academics
21st-century American women